Technical Safety Authority of Saskatchewan is an arms length agency of the Government of Saskatchewan, responsible for the inspection and safety monitoring of boilers, pressure vessels, elevating devices and amusement park rides in the province. At its creation, 52 Licensing and Inspections Branch staff were transferred from the Ministry of Corrections, Public Safety and Policing.

See also
Canadian Standards Association
Technical Standards and Safety Authority - equivalent organization in Ontario

References

Saskatchewan government ministries and agencies
Organizations based in Regina, Saskatchewan
Organizations established in 2010
2010 establishments in Saskatchewan